Hugh Fortescue may refer to:

 Hugh Fortescue (1665–1719), British politician
 Hugh Fortescue, 1st Earl Clinton (1696 – 1751), British peer
 Hugh Fortescue, 1st Earl Fortescue (1753–1841), British peer
 Hugh Fortescue, 2nd Earl Fortescue (1783–1861), British Whig politician
 Hugh Fortescue, 3rd Earl Fortescue (1818–1905), British peer and politician
 Hugh Fortescue, 4th Earl Fortescue (1854–1932), English Liberal politician
 Hugh Fortescue, 5th Earl Fortescue (1888–1958), British peer and Conservative politician